Minhaj Uddin Mahmud (1989) is a Bangladeshi chess International Master.

Career
Minhaj Uddin earned the FIDE Master title in 2007 and International Master title in 2012.

Minhaj Uddin has won the Bangladesh men's chess championship in 2010.

Minhaj Uddin has represented Bangladesh in several Chess competitions, from 2008 to 2015.

References

External links
 

1989 births
Living people
Bangladeshi chess players
Chess Olympiad competitors
Chess players at the 2010 Asian Games
Asian Games competitors for Bangladesh
Chess International Masters